The 2016 Aegon Surbiton Trophy was a professional tennis tournament played on outdoor grass courts. It was the thirteenth edition of the tournament for the men and the fourteenth edition of the tournament for the women. It was part of the 2016 ATP Challenger Tour and the 2016 ITF Women's Circuit, offering a total prize money of €42,500 for men and $50,000 for women. It took place in Surbiton, United Kingdom, on 6–12 June 2016.

Men's singles main draw entrants

Seeds 

 1 Rankings as of 23 May 2016

Other entrants 
The following players received wildcards into the singles main draw:
  Liam Broady
  Edward Corrie
  Lloyd Glasspool
  Alexander Ward

The following players received entry into the singles main draw as a special exempt:
  Tobias Kamke

The following players received entry from the qualifying draw:
  Marius Copil
  Bradley Mousley
  Jonny O'Mara
  Michał Przysiężny

The following player entered as lucky loser:
  Joshua Milton

Women's singles main draw entrants

Seeds 

 1 Rankings as of 23 May 2016.

Other entrants 
The following player received a wildcard into the singles main draw:
  Emily Appleton
  Harriet Dart
  Samantha Murray
  Gabriella Taylor

The following players received entry from the qualifying draw:
  Emily Arbuthnott
  Georgina Axon
  Magdalena Fręch
  Alexandra Stevenson

The following player received entry by a lucky loser spot:
  Emma Hurst

The following player received entry by a protected ranking:
  Melanie Oudin

Champions

Men's singles
 
 Lu Yen-hsun def.  Marius Copil, 7–5, 7–6(13–11)

Women's singles

 Marina Melnikova def.  Stéphanie Foretz, 6–3, 7–6(8–6)

Men's doubles

  Purav Raja /  Divij Sharan def.  Ken Skupski /  Neal Skupski, 6–4, 7–6(7–3)

Women's doubles

 Sanaz Marand /  Melanie Oudin def.  Robin Anderson /  Alison Bai, 6–4, 7–5

External links 
 2016 Aegon Surbiton Trophy at ITFtennis.com
 Official website

2016 ITF Women's Circuit
2016 ATP Challenger Tour
2016 in British sport
2016 sports events in London
June 2016 sports events in the United Kingdom
2016